The Minolta X-1 (XK in North America, XM in Europe and elsewhere) was the professional model in the Minolta line-up. It took about ten years to develop and started a new era in the Minolta SR system. It was the first Minolta SLR with interchangeable lenses to have an electronically controlled shutter, a horizontically traveling shutter with titanium foil curtains and capable of a shortest speed of 1/2000s (longest selectable was 16 s). It had interchangeable finders:

 AE-Finder: The standard finder with a refined CLC metering system (introduced by the SR-T 101) and aperture priority auto exposure mode.
 M-Finder: A simpler and cheaper version of the AE-finder, the match-needle finder. It did not show metered shutter times but had only a needle to align. It lacked the automatic mode.
 P-finder: The plain finder, an unmetered pentaprism finder, which gave the X-1 a much more compact silhouette than the bulky finders above.
 High-Magnification-Finder: Unmetered finder with 6.2 magnification ratio and diopter adjustment.
 Waist-Level-Finder: Unmetered with magnifier.
 AE-S-Finder: Introduced with the X-1 Motor and equipped with a silicon cell instead of the slower CdS-cell of the AE-Finder. This was necessary for the auto exposure mode with motorized action.

And the photographer had the choice among nine (later eleven) interchangeable focussing screens. It further had a socket for a synchronised flash shoe, mirror lock up feature, stop down lever, multi-exposure capability.

The X-1 was the first of the X-series and so a completely new designed lens line was introduced and labelled with 'MC Rokkor-X' in the North American market (the rest of the world kept the plain 'MC Rokkor' designation). The most striking attribute was the new waffled rubber coating of the focus grip. The X-1 and its export descendants were available in black finish only.

External links
 The Rokkor Files
 Modern Classics Review

135 film cameras
X-1